Luis Villares Naveira (born 8 August 1978 in Lugo, Spain) is a Spanish jurist and En Marea candidate for President of the Xunta of Galicia in the 2016 Galician parliamentary election.

References

1978 births
Living people
Members of the 10th Parliament of Galicia
21st-century Spanish judges